Jimmy Lewis Love Sr. is a former Democratic member of the North Carolina House of Representatives, who represented the state's 51st district from 2007 till losing re-election in 2010.

Electoral history

2010

2008

2006

2002

References

External links
North Carolina General Assembly – Representative Jimmy L. Love Sr. official NC House website
Project Vote Smart – Representative Jimmy L. Love Sr. (NC) profile
Follow the Money – Jimmy L. Love Sr.
2008 2006 campaign contributions

Living people
Year of birth missing (living people)
People from Sanford, North Carolina
University of North Carolina at Chapel Hill alumni
North Carolina lawyers
21st-century American politicians
Democratic Party members of the North Carolina House of Representatives